The Order of Camões is a Portuguese order of knighthood originally created in 1985 but only fully integrated into the Portuguese honours system on 30 June 2021. It commemorates Luís de Camões, considered Portugal's national poet.

It is a six-tier order, whose titles are awarded for relevant services to the Portuguese language and its international promotion, and to the strengthening of cultural relations between Portuguese-speaking peoples and communities. The number of members in each grade is restricted by its constitution, and titles are conferred by special decree by the Grand Master of the Order, i.e., the President of Portugal.

Grades 
The order includes several classes; in decreasing order of seniority, these are:

  Grand Collar (Grande-Colar – GColCa)
  Grand Cross (Grã-Cruz – GCCa)
  Grand Officer (Grande-Oficial – GOCa)
  Commander (Comendador – ComCa)
  Officer (Oficial – OCa)
  Knight/Dame (Cavaleiro – CvCa / Dama – DmCa)
 Honorary Member (MHCa) (Membro Honorário) — for places or institutions, without indication of a specific grade

The special distinction of Grand Collar can be awarded only to heads of state.

Membership to the Order is conferred by the President, either on his own initiative, upon the recommendation of his Ministers or following nomination by the Council of the Order.

References

External links

Honorific orders of Portugal

Orders of chivalry of Portugal
Orders of chivalry awarded to heads of state, consorts and sovereign family members